"Another Day in Paradise" is a song recorded by English drummer and singer-songwriter Phil Collins. Produced by Collins along with Hugh Padgham, it was released as the first single from his number-one album ...But Seriously (1989). As with his song for Genesis, "Man on the Corner", the track has as its subject the problem of homelessness and paradise; as such, the song was a substantial departure from the dance-pop music of his previous album, No Jacket Required (1985).

Collins sings the song from a third-person perspective, as he observes a man crossing the street to ignore a homeless woman, and he implores listeners not to turn a blind eye to homelessness because, by drawing a religious allusion, "it's just another day for you and me in paradise". Collins also appeals directly to God by singing: "Oh Lord, is there nothing more anybody can do? Oh Lord, there must be something you can say."

The song was Collins' seventh and final Billboard Hot 100 No. 1 single, the last No. 1 single of the 1980s and the first No. 1 single of the 1990s. It was also a worldwide success, eventually becoming one of the most successful songs of his solo career. It won Collins and Padgham the Grammy Award for Record of the Year at the 1991 awards ceremony, while it was also nominated for Song of the Year, Best Pop Vocal Performance, Male and Best Music Video, Short Form. "Another Day in Paradise" also won an award for British Single at the 1990 Brit Awards. Despite the awards gained following its release, the song also generated controversy over its subject matter and has received a largely unfavourable reaction from music critics.

The live performance of the song at the 1991 Grammy Awards by Collins and David Crosby, who provided backing vocals on the track, was released on the 1994 album Grammy's Greatest Moments Volume I. In 2009, Collins' version was listed 86th on Billboards Greatest Songs of All Time. "Another Day in Paradise" has since been covered by several artists, including Brandy and her brother Ray J, Jam Tronik, Axxis, Novecento, Brad Arnold and Hank Marvin.

Chart performance
The song was another hit for Collins. On 23 December 1989, it became his seventh No. 1 single in the U.S. The song was also the final No. 1 song of the 1980s in the U.S., and remained at No. 1 for four weeks, which classifies the song as a hit from the 1990s as well. This song is notable for keeping Janet Jackson's "Rhythm Nation" from reaching No. 1. It also saw out the 1980s and saw in the 1990s at the top of the German singles chart. The song had already reached No. 2 in the UK in November of that year. The single version is slightly different from the album version in that it uses a shorter intro.

Music video
The song's music video was directed by Jim Yukich and produced by Paul Flattery of FYI. The video, shot entirely in black and white, features Collins singing in a dark background, interspersed with images of the homeless, the refugees and the poverty of children in the streets. The music video also features many messages about the homeless, to convey the full message of the song. Collins' part was shot in less than an hour in New York.

Reception
"Another Day in Paradise" provoked controversy upon release. Some critics found the wealthy Collins unqualified to sing about the poor, while others accused him of profiteering from homelessness. Collins responded, "When I drive down the street, I see the same things everyone else sees. It's a misconception that if you have a lot of money you're somehow out of touch with reality." Billboard nevertheless gave a positive review, calling it a "poignant" track whose "subject matter is complemented nicely by a subdued, ethereal musical context".

Commentary of the song has been largely unfavourable. Singer-songwriter and political activist Billy Bragg gave a 2000 interview in which he negatively compared Collins to the Clash, stating, "Collins might write a song about the homeless, but if he doesn't have the action to go with it he's just exploiting that for a subject." In 2007, Blender remarked that Collins "wrote the worst song ever about homelessness", while Caroline Sullivan of The Guardian said the track addresses homelessness with the "same insight" as Melanie C's critically reviled "If That Were Me". Writing for the BBC in 2010, David Sheppard described the song's lyrics as "cringe-worthy" and gave it as an example of Collins "painting the bull's-eye on his own forehead" when it came to his negative status with music critics.

It was reported that Collins left the UK for Switzerland in 1997, in response to the election of a socialist Labour government; Collins stated that he left to be with future wife Orianne Cevey. In 2013, MSN's Hugh Wilson said this relocation led to further accusations of hypocrisy, since Collins "bemoaned the plight of the homeless in the song 'Another Day in Paradise' " then "lugged his estimated £130 million fortune to Switzerland where the tax regime is far less punishing for the super wealthy".

In a 2016 article for The Guardian, Michael Hann wrote, "Collins has been unfairly criticised for many things, but 'Another Day in Paradise' is not one of them. Criticism of that is manifestly fair." Hann argued that the song patronizes the general public, who "almost certainly encounter poverty more often than [Collins]", and chided Collins for "[equating] his material wealth with his listener's by pointing out that both 'you and me' are in paradise". On the other hand, Jamie Wales of Gigwise described the track as a "classic", and said of the hypocrisy allegations levelled at Collins, "The truth is Phil collected money for homeless charities from fans who attended his concerts and then donated double the total takings out of his own money."

Formats and track listings
12" single
"Another Day in Paradise" (album version) – 5:22
"Another Day in Paradise" (radio edit) – 4:40

CD maxi single
"Another Day in Paradise" – 5:15
"Saturday Night and Sunday Morning" – 1:25
"Heat on the Street" – 3:59

7" single
"Another Day in Paradise" – 4:48
"Heat on the Street" – 3:59

3" CD single
 "Another Day in Paradise" 5:19
 "Saturday Night and Sunday Morning" 1:26
 "Heat on the Street" 4:00

Virgin - VSCD1233 (Martin H)

Personnel 
 Phil Collins – vocals, keyboards, drums, Roland TR-808 drum machine
 David Crosby – backing vocals
 Dominic Miller – electric guitar, classical guitar
 Leland Sklar – bass

Charts

Weekly charts

Year-end charts

All-time charts

Certifications

Jam Tronik version

Less than six months after the release of the original Phil Collins version, a cover version by German dance act Jam Tronik was released as their debut single. In the United Kingdom, the song first charted in March 1990, reaching a peak of number 19 on the UK Singles Chart in the first week of April. It also charted in Germany and Belgium. Sampled in this version is the drum loop from the 1988 Raze song "Break 4 Love". The B-side, "Get on the Raze", also samples "Break 4 Love".

Charts

Brandy and Ray J version

In 2001, siblings Brandy and Ray J covered the song for the Phil Collins tribute album Urban Renewal. Produced by Guy Roche and released as the album's lead single in March 2001, the cover version became a top-10 success in Australia and across Europe, receiving gold certifications in Australia (35,000), France (250,000), Germany (250,000), and Switzerland (20,000). In 2002, this version of the song was included on the European edition of Brandy's Full Moon album.

Music video
The music video follows a homeless woman wandering the streets being chastised by various people, including a waitress, a businessman, and a police officer. The video is intercut with scenes of Brandy and Ray J singing on a fire escape and along alleyways, while also following the woman and taking photographs of each incident with a camera. The homeless woman then walks into a luxurious shoe boutique, and the receptionist calls the police to escort her out. When she is dropped back to her makeshift shelter in an alleyway, one of the policemen comes across a series of Polaroids depicting all of the previous characters, including himself, in the homeless woman's place. At the end of the video, Brandy and Ray J come to pick up the homeless woman and walk off with her into the distance.

Track listings
CD maxi single
 "Another Day in Paradise" (R&B-Version) – 4:32
 "Another Day in Paradise" (Stargate Mix) – 4:19
 "Another Day in Paradise" (Stargate Classic Club) – 4:22
 "Another Day in Paradise" (Knee Deep Remix) – 6:28
 "Another Day in Paradise" (Black Legend VS. J-Reverse Club Mix) – 7:54
			
CD single
 "Another Day in Paradise" (R&B-Version) – 4:32
 "Another Day in Paradise" (Stargate Mix) – 4:19

The Remixes – 12-inch maxi
 "Another Day in Paradise" (Knee Deep Remix) – 6:28
 "Another Day in Paradise" (Black Legend vs. J-Reverse Club Mix) – 7:54

Credits and personnel
 Arrangement – Guy Roche
 Engineering – Dushyant Bhakta, Doarian Cheah
 Engineering assistance – Michael Huff, Ron Ben-Simon
 Mixing – Brad Gilderman
 Production – Guy Roche
 Songwriting – Phil Collins

Charts

Weekly charts

Year-end charts

Certifications

Release history

Notable covers
 In 2016, the song was covered by Casa & Nova. Their cover was nominated by The Hollywood Music in Media Awards (HMMA) in the category EDM (Electronic Dance Music).

See also
List of European number-one airplay songs of the 1990s

References

External links
  (From the Phil Collins YouTube channel)

1989 songs
1989 singles
1990 singles
2001 singles
Atlantic Records singles
Billboard Hot 100 number-one singles
Black-and-white music videos
Brandy Norwood songs
Brit Award for British Single
Cashbox number-one singles
European Hot 100 Singles number-one singles
Grammy Award for Record of the Year
Music videos directed by Gil Green
Number-one singles in Belgium
Number-one singles in Finland
Number-one singles in Germany
Number-one singles in Norway
Number-one singles in Portugal
Number-one singles in Sweden
Number-one singles in Switzerland
Number-one singles in Zimbabwe
Phil Collins songs
Protest songs
Ray J songs
RPM Top Singles number-one singles
Song recordings produced by Hugh Padgham
Song recordings produced by Phil Collins
Songs about homelessness
Songs about poverty
Songs written by Phil Collins
Virgin Records singles
Warner Music Group singles
ZYX Music singles